General James Robertson Craufurd (1804–1888) was a senior British Army officer.

Military career
Crauford was commissioned into the Grenadier Guards. He was commander of the Brigade of Guards during the Crimean War. He then became Major General commanding the Brigade of Guards in 1861. He was promoted to lieutenant general in 1863 

In 1864, he became colonel of the 27th (Inniskilling) Regiment of Foot. Then, transferring to the 91st (Argyllshire Highlanders) Regiment of Foot in 1870.

His final promotion was to general in 1871; he retired in 1877.

Family

Craufurd lived at Princes Gardens in London.

He married Elizabeth Georgiana Harriett Harcourt (nee Cavendish), the widow of Charles Harcourt and former sister-in-law of Georges, marquis d'Harcourt.

References

 

|-
 

|-
 

1804 births
1888 deaths
British Army generals
British Army personnel of the Crimean War
Grenadier Guards officers